Nisith Kumar Malik, is an Indian politician member of All India Trinamool Congress.  He is an MLA, elected from the  Bardhaman Uttar constituency in the 2016 West Bengal Legislative Assembly election. In 2021 assembly election he was re-elected from the same constituency.

References 

Trinamool Congress politicians from West Bengal
Living people
People from Purba Bardhaman district
West Bengal MLAs 2021–2026
Year of birth missing (living people)